Mu'aadh Abdulkhalek (Arabic: معاذ عبدالخالق; born 2 January 1972) is a Yemeni former football goalkeeper who last played for Al-Oruba in the Yemeni League.

Honours

Club
Al-Ahli San'aYemeni League: 6
 1991–92 ، 1993–94 ، 1998–99 ، 1999–00 ، 2000–01، 2006–07
Yemeni President Cup: 3
2001, 2004, 2009
Yemeni Super Cup: 3
2007, 2008, 2009
Yemeni Unity Cup: 1
2004Runner-up: 1999
Esteghlal Cup: 1
2006

Al-Oruba

Yemeni League: 1
2010–11
Yemeni Super Cup: 1
 2011

External links

References

1972 births
Living people
Yemeni footballers
Yemen international footballers
Association football goalkeepers
Al-Oruba (Yemeni) players
Footballers at the 2002 Asian Games
Al-Ahli Club Sana'a players
Yemeni League players
Asian Games competitors for Yemen